Dead End (데드엔드) is a South Korean feature film.  It was released on November 14, 2013.  The director of this 96-minute mystery/thriller was Yoon Yeo-chang (윤여창).  The lead is played by Kim Min-jun (김민준).  Other cast members include Yoo Sang-jeon (우상전) and Choi Joon-yong (최준용).

Plot
A movie producer has to leave the city because he had faked a documentary film.  He winds up making a film the lives of ginseng harvesters, but even then problems ensue.

Sources
 http://www.hancinema.net/korean_movie_Dead_End.php
 http://www.hancinema.net/korean_movie_Dead_End.php#synopsis
 http://movie.naver.com/movie/bi/mi/basic.nhn?code=88238 (in Korean)
 http://moviejoy.com/themem/e_view.asp?db=qna5&num=11035

2013 films
South Korean mystery thriller films
2010s South Korean films